The Darkness is a haunted house attraction located in St Louis, Missouri, owned by Larry Kirchner, who has a long history of operating haunted houses in the St. Louis area. The Darkness opened in 1994. The place has been considered one of the scariest haunted houses in America.

According to Lisa Morton the attraction is praised for its Hollywood quality special effects and in 2013 the site Haunted World listed the Darkness under 2 in the list of best haunted houses of all time. America Haunts, a national association of haunted attractions, praised the Darkness  and assigned it legendary status.  

As of 2022 it is currently on its 29th year of operation.  The Darkness first started life in the old Welch Baby Carriage Factory in downtown St Louis (Soulard area).  After ten years their original building was sold to be developed into apartments, the owners of The Darkness bought the building next door.  After buying their current location they expanded the building to add another 10,000 square feet and added Terror Visions 3D, Horror Gift Store and actors area on the bottom floor.  In 2017 the owners of The Darkness bought another building next door to The darkness and opened St Louis Escape.  St Louis Escape features 7 escape rooms including Jurassic Island, Frankenstein, Dracula, Cellar, Blackbeards Curse, Wonderful Wizard of Oz, and Haunted Hotel.  In 2020 St Louis Escape added a 1980's themed Blacklight Mini Golf called Retro Golf.

The Darkness and St Louis Escape are two of St Louis' top tourist attractions.  The owners of The Darkness helped bring the National Haunted House and Halloween Tradeshow to St Louis 13 years ago (Transworld).  The Darkness with St Louis Escape open for haunt/escape owner/operators each year offering behind the scenes tours.  The Darkness has been featured by virtually every youtuber and national reality show from Grim Life Collective, Carpetbagger to reality shows like Shipping Wars, Travel Channel specials to Modern Marvels, Myth Busters and more.

References 

Haunted attractions (simulated)